Provincial Road 588 (PR 588) is a provincial road in the Canadian province of Manitoba.

Route description 
Provincial Road 588 links PR 279 to PR 275. It is paved for two miles from PR 275 to Big Woody, a small hamlet by the Woody River. The route also crosses Lambert's Hill, a steep hill just south of the Porcupine Mountains. PR 588 serves as a collector road for the surrounding rural areas and is also used to access Whitefish Lake.

History 
PR 588 has changed significantly from its original route. A southern leg of this route used to extend from PR 275, four miles west of the junction with the still-existing northern leg, to PTH 83 near Benito. Furthermore, PR 588 used to go around Lambert's hill because it was so steep, but the grade has since been cut down. Also, it used to extend further to reach PR 279 which has also changed its alignment. Overall, the original length was 46 kilometres. Part of the southern leg is now signed as PR 487. The other part is maintained by the Rural Municipality of Swan River. Some old provincial roadsigns still remain along this part of the route.

588